Some species endemic to New Zealand are causing problems in other countries, similar to the way introduced species in New Zealand cause problems for agriculture and indigenous biodiversity.

Animals

The New Zealand mud snail (Potamopyrgus antipodarum) is an invasive species in many countries and has been present in Europe since 1859.
The New Zealand flatworm (Arthurdendyus triangulatus) is an invasive species in Europe where it preys on earthworms and degrades soil quality.

Plants
 Taupata (Coprosma repens), also known as mirror bush, looking-glass bush, New Zealand laurel or shiny leaf, is a weed in Australia, Norfolk Island, South Africa and the U.S. (California and Hawaii).
Pohutukawa (Metrosideros excelsa), sometimes called the New Zealand Christmas tree, is an invasive species in South Africa.
The biddy biddy (Acaena novae-zelandiae) is declared a noxious weed in the American states of Hawaii, California and Oregon. It is also a problem plant in Northumberland.
New Zealand flax or harekeke (Phormium tenax) is an invasive species in St Helena, some Pacific islands and in Australia.
Pohuehue (Muehlenbeckia complexa), also called wire vine, mattress vine and several other common names, is naturalised in Western Australia. Although it is a valued garden plant, it can become a pest in suitable climates (e.g. San Francisco's Golden Gate National Recreation Area) if not contained.
Manuka (Leptospermum scoparium) and kanuka (Kunzea ericoides) were planted in Hawaii during the early 20th century and have infested several islands.
Ngaio (Myoporum laetum) forms dense thickets in coastal areas of Southern California and Mexico and is therefore a serious weed.

See also
Invasive species in New Zealand
Invasive species of Australian origin

References

Biota of New Zealand

Invasive species